Judge Schroeder may refer to:

Mary M. Schroeder (born 1940), judge of the United States Court of Appeals for the Ninth Circuit
Robert W. Schroeder III (born 1966), judge of the United States District Court for the Eastern District of Texas
Thomas D. Schroeder (born 1959), judge of the United States District Court for the Middle District of North Carolina

See also
Justice Schroeder (disambiguation)